Davor Užbinec is a Croatian business manager and professional basketball executive, currently serving as the general manager of Slovenian club KK Cedevita Olimpija.

Užbinec was a general manager of a Croatian club Cedevita, from 2015 to 2019.

Business career 
During his business career, Užbinec worked for Rotoplast, Bakrotisak, HON-ING, La log, and Lura. In the Atlantic Grupa he worked for twelve years.

Basketball executive career

KK Cedevita (2005–2019) 
Užbinec joined Zagreb-based basketball club Cedevita in 2005 as a board member. In 2010, he became a vice president of the club. In October 2015, Užbinec was named the general manager of the club, right after then-general manager Krešimir Novosel became the manager for the Adriatic Basketball Association.

During his tenure as the club's general manager, Cedevita won three Croatian League championships (2016, 2017, and 2018) and four Krešimir Ćosić Cup tournaments (2016, 2017, 2018, and 2019).

KK Cedevita Olimpija (2019–present) 
In July 2019, Užbinec became the first general manager of Cedevita Olimpija, a newly-formed basketball club based in Ljubljana, Slovenia.

References

External links
 Davor Užbinec at cedevita.olimpija.com
 Davor Užbinec at eurobasket.com

Living people
Croatian basketball coaches
Croatian businesspeople
Croatian men's basketball players
Croatian sports executives and administrators
KK Cedevita
KK Cedevita Olimpija executives
Year of birth missing (living people)